Four ships of the United States Navy have borne the name Bagley. The first three were named after Ensign Worth Bagley. The fourth, FF‑1069, honors both Worth Bagley and his brother, Admiral David W. Bagley.

 , was a torpedo boat launched in 1900 and decommissioned in 1919.
 , was a Wickes-class destroyer, launched in 1918 and then transferred to the Royal Navy.
 , was the lead destroyer of her class, launched in 1936 and decommissioned in 1946.
 , was a Knox-class frigate, launched in 1971 and decommissioned in 1992.

Sources

United States Navy ship names